SXR may refer to:

 Pregnane X receptor, a nuclear receptor whose primary function is to sense the presence of foreign toxic substances
 Srinagar International Airport (IATA code SXR), in Jammu and Kashmir, India
 Soft X-rays